The Alexandrian Pleiad is the name given to a group of seven Alexandrian poets and tragedians in the 3rd century BC (Alexandria was at that time the literary center of the Mediterranean) working in the court of Ptolemy II Philadelphus.  The name derives from the seven stars of the Pleiades star cluster.

There are several conflicting lists of the greatest poets of the Alexandrian age (traditionally ascribed to Aristophanes of Byzantium and Aristarchus of Samothrace), which include the  "Alexandrian Pleiad", some with tragic poets, other which include lyric or epic poets. The following members are always included in the "Alexandrian Pleiad":

 Homerus the Younger, son of Andromachus, from Byzantium, associated with "Tragic pleiad"
 Philiscus of Corcyra
 Lycophron
 Alexander Aetolus, tragic poet
 Sositheus of Alexandria, dramatist
 Aeantides, a poet traditionally associated with the "Tragic pleiad"
 
The other members are variously:
 Theocritus, who wrote the bucolic poems
 Aratus, who wrote the Phaenomena and other poems
 Nicander
 Apollonius, who wrote the Argonautica
 Sosiphanes of Syracuse, tragic poet
 Dionysiades

Later uses
The name "Pléiade" was adopted in 1323 by a group of fourteen poets (seven men and seven women) in Toulouse and is used as well to refer to the group of poets around Pierre de Ronsard and Joachim du Bellay in France in the 16th century (see "La Pléiade"). In modern times, "pleiad" is also used as a collective noun for a small group of brilliant or eminent persons.

Sources
The Oxford Classical Dictionary. London: Oxford University Press, 1949.

Ancient Greek poets
Tragic poets
Ptolemaic court